Manila's 1st congressional district is one of the six congressional districts of the Philippines in the city of Manila. It has been represented in the House of Representatives of the Philippines since 1916 and earlier in the Philippine Assembly from 1907 to 1916. The district consists of barangays 1 to 146 in the western part of the Manila district of Tondo, west of Dagupan Street, Estero de Vitas and Estero de Sunog Apog. It is currently represented in the 19th Congress by Ernesto M. Dionisio Jr. of Asenso Manileño and Lakas–CMD.

Representation history

Election results

2022

2019

2016

2013

2010

See also
Legislative districts of Manila

References

Congressional districts of the Philippines
Politics of Manila
1907 establishments in the Philippines
Congressional districts of Metro Manila
Constituencies established in 1907